NA-128 (Lahore-XI) was a constituency for the National Assembly of Pakistan. After the 2018 delimitations, its areas were divided among NA-135 (Lahore-XIII) and NA-136 (Lahore-XIV).

Boundaries
This is one of the largest national assembly constituency in Lahore starting from Kharak stop on Multan Road and going all the way to the boundary of Lahore district near Manga Mandi, and also stretches to the two of Raiwind. Major Areas are Thokar Niaz Beg, Johar Town, Mustafa Town, Wapda Town, NFC Society, Valencia, Bahria Town and many villages along Raiwind Road.

Election 2002 

General elections were held on 10 Oct 2002. Malik Zaheer Abbas of PPP won by 31,175 votes.

Election 2008 

General elections were held on 18 Feb 2008. Malik Muhammad Afzal Khokhar of PML-N won by 65,727 votes.

Election 2013 

General elections were held on 11 May 2013. Malik Muhammad Afzal Khokhar of PML-N won by 124,107 votes and became the  member of National Assembly beating Malik Karamat Ali Khokhar of Pakistan Tehreek-e-Insaf (PTI). However on 6 September 2014, it was announced in local media that there were reports of massive rigging in this constituency. Election results reported that a total 223,132 votes were polled when in reality, this number was only about 192,660.

References

External links 
 Election result's official website

NA-128
Abolished National Assembly Constituencies of Pakistan